Crystal Ball is a box set by American recording artist Prince. It includes Crystal Ball, the artist's twentieth studio album, which is a three-disc set of "previously bootlegged" material, together with a fourth disc, The Truth, the twenty-first studio album by Prince.

The box set was initially only available through direct orders by phone and internet. The direct order edition included a fifth disc, an instrumental studio album by The NPG Orchestra titled Kamasutra. Shipment of this limited edition 5-CD version started on January 29, 1998, approximately two months before the release of the 4-CD version to retail stores on March 21, 1998.

The album Crystal Ball is Prince's second triple album in succession, following Emancipation. Each of the three CDs contain ten tracks and last fifty minutes, resembling Emancipations 12-song, sixty-minute disc lengths.

In 2018, NPG Records released Crystal Ball and The Truth digitally on Spotify, iTunes, Tidal, and Apple Music.

In 2021, a special limited vinyl edition of The Truth was released on Record Store Day.

Crystal Ball

Track listing

Notes
 * – denotes song edited/revised for this album & can be found in original form on unofficial bootlegs.
 ‡ – denotes remix of already released song.
 † – Found in full form on Bright Lights, Big City soundtrack.

Charts

The Truth 

The Truth is the twenty-first studio album by Prince. It was released as the fourth CD in the Crystal Ball box set. The arrangements are mainly based around the acoustic guitar, augmented with elaborate production effects, multi-layered vocals, and occasional percussion and percussive effects. A CD single was released prior to the album, consisting of the record's first two tracks. In 2018, NPG Records released The Truth digitally on Spotify, iTunes, Tidal, and Apple Music. In 2021, a special limited vinyl edition of The Truth was released on Record Store Day.

Track listing 
 "The Truth" – 3:34
 "Don't Play Me" – 2:48
 "Circle of Amour" – 4:43
 "3rd 👁" – 4:53
 "Dionne" – 3:13
 "Man in a Uniform" – 3:07
 "Animal Kingdom" – 4:01
 "The Other Side of the Pillow" – 3:21
 "Fascination" – 4:55
 "One of Your Tears" – 3:27
 "Comeback" – 1:59
 "Welcome 2 the Dawn" (acoustic version) – 3:17

Charts

Kamasutra 

Kamasutra is an instrumental studio album by The NPG Orchestra. It was first released on cassette on February 14, 1997, and later in the limited edition Crystal Ball box set as the fifth CD on January 29, 1998, by NPG Records. The album was written to be played during Prince's wedding to Mayte Garcia in 1996. The tracks range in style from classical music, jazz, and experimentations with various sounds. For example, the track "Cutz" uses the sound of scissors snipping as its basis. Another track, "The Plan", was previewed in an excerpt on the 1996 3-CD set Emancipation.

Track listing 
 "The Plan" – 2:02
 "Kamasutra" – 11:49
 "At Last... The Lost Is Found" – 3:38
 "The Ever Changing Light" – 3:00
 "Cutz" – 3:03
 "Serotonin" – 0:46
 "Promise/Broken" – 3:45
 "Barcelona" – 2:17
 "Kamasutra/Overture #8" – 3:13
 "Coincidence or Fate?" – 3:22
 "Kamasutra/Eternal Embrace" – 4:02

Personnel 

 Airiq Anest – programming
 Michael Bland (as Michael B.) – drums, background vocals
 Tommy Barbarella – guitar, recorder, background vocals, engineering
 Joe Blaney – engineering
 Bonnie Boyer – voices
 Hans Buff – engineering, mastering
 Keith "KC" Cohen – programming
 Morris Day – drums
 Steve Durkee – engineering
 D.K. Dyson – percussion, vocals, vox continental
 Carmen Electra – vocals
 Clare Fischer – arranger, conductor, orchestration
 Dave Friedlander – engineering
 Brian Gardner – mastering
 Tom Garneau – engineering
 Ray Hahnfeldt – engineering
 Heidi Hanschu – engineering
 Fred Harrington – engineering
 Tim Hoogenakker – engineering
 Kimm James – engineering
 Kathy Jensen – clarinet
 Femi Jiya – engineering
 Kirk Johnson – percussion, programming, production, beat programming, vox continental
 Kirk "KjustinJ" Johnson – percussion, vocals, production, beat programming
 Kaj – programming
 Shane T. Keller – engineering
 Kirky J. - mixing
 Michael Koppelman – engineering
 Eric Leeds – horn, saxophone
 David Leonard – engineering
 Peggy Mac – engineering
 Mayte – vocals, background vocals
 Susannah Melvoin – vocals, background vocals
 Mr. Hayes – guitar, background vocals
 Steve Noonan – engineering
 Original – bass
 Parke – design, concept, package concept
 Ricky Peterson – programming, production
 Brian Poer – engineering
 Prince – arrangements, vocals, multi-instruments, noise, production, mixing, FX vocals, instrumentation, vox continental
 Susan Rogers – engineering
 Mike Scott – guitar
 Shock G – mixing
 Rhonda Smith – bass, percussion, vocals
 Sonny T. – guitar, horn, vocals, background vocals, engineering
 David Tickle – engineering
 Tom Tucker – engineering
 Ric Wilson – mastering
 Yo Grandma – guitar, claves
 Yo Mama – guitar, vocals
 David Z – engineering
 Chuck Zwicky – engineering

References

External links 
 Crystal Ball online booklet

1998 albums
Prince (musician) albums
Albums produced by Prince (musician)
NPG Records albums